This page shows the results of the Diving Competition for men and women at the 1983 Pan American Games, held from August 14 to August 29, 1983 in Caracas, Venezuela. There were two events, for both men and women.

Men's competition

3m Springboard

10m Platform

Women's competition

3m Springboard

10m Platform

Medal table

See also
 Diving at the 1984 Summer Olympics

References
 Sports 123

1983
Events at the 1983 Pan American Games
1983 in diving